Bridge into the New Age is an album by saxophonist Azar Lawrence which was recorded in 1974 and released on the Prestige label.

Reception

The Allmusic site awarded the album 4 stars.

Track listing 
All compositions by Azar Lawrence.

 "Bridge into the New Age" – 6:45   
 "Fatisha" – 4:05   
 "Warriors of Peace" – 7:59   
 "Forces of Nature" – 8:41   
 "The Beautiful and Omnipresent Love" – 10:07

Personnel 
Azar Lawrence – soprano saxophone, tenor saxophone
Woody Shaw – trumpet (tracks 1 & 5)
Julian Priester – trombone (track 4)
Arthur Blythe (“Black Arthur”) – alto saxophone (tracks 3 & 4)
Hadley Caliman – flute (track 4)
Ray Straughter – wood flute (track 5)
Joe Bonner – piano (tracks 2–4)
Woody Murray – vibraphone (tracks 1 & 5)
John Heard (tracks 3 & 4), Clint Houston (tracks 1 & 5) – bass
Billy Hart (tracks 1 & 5), Ndugu (tracks 3 & 4) – drums
Mtume – congas, percussion (tracks 3 & 4)
Guilherme Franco (tracks 1 & 5), Kenneth Nash (tracks 2 & 5) – percussion 
Jean Carn – vocals (tracks 1 & 5)

References 

1975 debut albums
Prestige Records albums
Albums produced by Orrin Keepnews